Pavlo Yuriyovych Tymoshchenko (born 13 October 1986) is a Ukrainian modern pentathlete. He competed at the 2008,  2012 and 2016 Summer Olympics, and won the silver medal in 2016.

Tymoshchenko took up modern pentathlon following his father, a former pentathlete. His favorite events are fencing and riding. He works as a police officer.

References

External links

1986 births
Living people
Ukrainian male modern pentathletes
Olympic modern pentathletes of Ukraine
Modern pentathletes at the 2008 Summer Olympics
Modern pentathletes at the 2012 Summer Olympics
Modern pentathletes at the 2016 Summer Olympics
Sportspeople from Kyiv
World Modern Pentathlon Championships medalists
Medalists at the 2016 Summer Olympics
Olympic silver medalists for Ukraine
Olympic medalists in modern pentathlon
Modern pentathletes at the 2020 Summer Olympics